Karl Jiszda (21 July 1899 – 30 November 1963) was an Austrian football (soccer) player and manager. He played for Floridsdorfer AC, First Vienna FC and Brooklyn Wanderers. 31 July 1921 Karl Jiszda debuted for the Austria national football team against Finland (2-3).

He coached Garbarnia Kraków, Floridsdorfer AC, FC Zürich and FC Oerlikon. In 1937 he worked as head coach of the Lithuania national football team.

References and notes

External links
 
 
 

1899 births
1963 deaths
Association football forwards
Austrian footballers
Austria international footballers
First Vienna FC players
Austrian football managers
Floridsdorfer AC managers
Lithuania national football team managers
FC Zürich managers
Association football defenders